The 2022 Dinos de Saltillo season was the Dinos de Saltillo sixth season in the Liga de Fútbol Americano Profesional (LFA) and their fourth under head coach Javier Adame. After the 2021 season was cancelled due to the COVID-19 pandemic, the Dinos returned to play in 2022.

After playing for six years in the Estadio Olímpico Francisco I. Madero, the Dinos moved to the Estadio Francisco I. Madero, home to the Mexican League team Saraperos de Saltillo, after an agreement between the two clubs.

Dinos finished the regular season as the first classified team with a 5–1 record. On the last game against the Raptors, Dinos missed the chance to become the first team ever to finish the regular season with a perfect record, when in the last play of the game, Raptors' quarterback Bruno Márquez scored a two point conversion to win the game 28–27.

The Dinos were defeated in the semifinals by the Gallos Negros 20–27.

Draft

Roster

Regular season

Standings

Schedule

Postseason

Schedule

References

2022 in American football
Dinos